Sing Buri is one of the central provinces (changwat) of Thailand. Neighboring provinces are (from north clockwise) Nakhon Sawan, Lopburi, Ang Thong, Suphan Buri, and Chai Nat.

Toponymy
The word sing originates from Sanskrit singh meaning 'lion' and buri, from Sanskrit puri meaning buri mueang 'fortified city' or 'town'. Hence the literal translation is 'lion city', sharing the same root as Singapore.

Geography
Sing Buri is located on the flat river plain of the Chao Phraya River valley. Eighty percent of the areas are wide flat areas, of which the soil is suitable for agriculture. There are a small number of slopes in swamps of different sizes. The highest average height of the area is 17 meter above sea level. Floods will occur during the rainy season.

Climate
Sing Buri province has a tropical savanna climate (Köppen climate classification category Aw). Winters are dry and warm. Temperatures rise until May. The monsoon season runs from May through October, with heavy rain and somewhat cooler temperatures during the day, although nights remain warm. Climate statistics: the maximum temperature is 41.4 °C (106.5 °F) in April and the lowest temperature is 10.2 °C (50.4 °F) in December. The highest average temperature is 36.8 °C (98.2 °F) and the minimum average temperature is 20.6 °C (69.1 °F). Annual average rainfall is 1,125 millimeters with mean rainy days is 17.6 in September. Maximum daily rainfall is 203.4 millimeters in October.

History
The area of Sing Buri held an important position in early Thai history from the Dvaravati period down to the Ayutthaya period. The city was originally on the banks of the Chaksi River. The first relocation was to the west of the Noi River (south of Sing Sutthara Temple) and later moved to Pak Bang Krathong, Ton Pho subdistrict. In 1869 the districts In Buri, Phrom Buri and Sing Buri were merged. In 1895 the three districts came under control of Krung Kao province ("Old capital"), monthon Krung Kao. In 1896 the city was moved to its final destination in Bang Phutsa subdistrict. In 1917 Mueang district changed its name to Bang Phutsa district. In 1938 the government changed the name of the capital district to be the same as the name of the province. So Bang Phutsa district uses the name Mueang Sing Buri until today. In 1939 Sing district was renamed Bang Rachan district.

Symbols

The provincial seal presents the history of Khai Bang Rachan. When the Burmese attacked Ayutthaya in 1765, 11 leaders with villagers from Bang Rachan fought the army when it stopped north of Ayutthaya. They managed to delay them for five months before they were finally defeated, soon thereafter Ayutthaya fell as well. Annually on 4 February a ceremony is held in remembrance of these local heroes. This story was also made into a movie in Thailand.
 Old seal was created in 1940, shows the fort Khai Bang Rachan.
 New seal was adopted in 2004, shows the eleven leaders who fought the Burmese.

The provincial tree is the Red Sandalwood Tree (Adenanthera pavonina).

Administrative divisions

Provincial government
The province is divided into six districts (amphoes). The districts are further subdivided into 45 subdistricts (tambons) and 364 villages (mubans).

Local government
As of 26 November 2019 there are: one Sing Buri Provincial Administration Organisation and 8 municipal (thesaban) areas in the province. Sing Buri and Bang Rachan have town (thesaban mueang) status. Further 6 subdistrict municipalities (thesaban tambon). The non-municipal areas are administered by 33 Subdistrict Administrative Organisations - SAO (ongkan borihan suan tambon).

Human achievement index 2017

Since 2003, United Nations Development Programme (UNDP) in Thailand has tracked progress on human development at sub-national level using the Human achievement index (HAI), a composite index covering all the eight key areas of human development. National Economic and Social Development Board (NESDB) has taken over this task since 2017.

References

External links

Website of province (Thai)
Singburi provincial map, coat of arms and postal stamp 

 
Provinces of Thailand